The Visit is a 2015 American found-footage horror film written, co-produced and directed by M. Night Shyamalan and starring Olivia DeJonge, Ed Oxenbould, Deanna Dunagan, Peter McRobbie, and Kathryn Hahn. The film centers around two young siblings, teenage Becca and her younger brother Tyler who live with their single divorced mother, who had left home 15 years ago and is estranged from her parents. After finding their grandchildren online and wanting to meet them, the grandparents invite them to spend a week at their farmhouse, while their mother goes on a cruise with her boyfriend. During their stay, the siblings notice their grandparents behaving strangely and they set out to find the truth behind the goings-on at the farmstead.

The film was released in North America on September 11, 2015, by Universal Pictures. It grossed $98.4 million worldwide against a $5 million production budget and received generally positive reviews from critics, with many calling it a return-to-form for Shyamalan's career.

Plot
Two siblings from Philadelphia, 15-year-old Becca and 14-year-old Tyler, prepare for a five-day visit with their grandparents while their divorced mother Loretta goes on a cruise with her boyfriend. Loretta reveals that she has not spoken to her parents in 15 years after marrying her high-school teacher, of whom her parents disapproved. Having never met their grandparents, the teens plan to record a documentary film about their visit using a camcorder.

Becca and Tyler meet their grandparents, referred to as "Nana" and "Pop Pop," at a train station. When they arrive at their isolated farmhouse, Becca and Tyler are instructed to never go into the basement because it contains mold, and that bedtime is at 9:30 every evening, after which they should not leave their room. Although at first, the grandparents seem pleasant, their behavior gradually becomes peculiar. The first night, an hour past curfew, Becca ventures downstairs for something to eat and sees Nana projectile vomiting. During the day, Nana creepily chases the teens who are playing hide-and-seek. Later, Tyler finds a pile of soiled diapers in the shed. In town, Pop Pop attacks a man he thinks is following them. When challenged, both grandparents are dismissive of each other's behavior. As the erratic behavior intensifies, Becca and Tyler's documentary-style film evolves into one of mystery-solving and evidence collection.

A woman Nana and Pop Pop helped in counseling brings a blueberry cobbler round to thank them, but following a confrontation, is not seen leaving. Concerned about her grandparents’ behavior, Becca checks the internet and concludes it is normal behavior for older people and a chat with Loretta reinforces this. Concerned about the events, Tyler decides to secretly film the living room during the night, but Nana discovers the camera and tries unsuccessfully to break into the children's locked bedroom with a knife.

Upon watching the footage of Nana with the knife, Becca and Tyler video call Loretta and beg her to collect them. Upon showing Loretta her parents while they are outside, she unnervingly declares they are not her parents. Realizing they have been staying with strangers, the teenagers try to leave the house, and suddenly discover Nana and Pop Pop hanged the woman from a tree, and forcefully encourage them to play Yahtzee. Later, Becca sneaks into the basement and finds the decomposed corpses of their real grandparents, along with uniforms from the psychiatric hospital at which they worked, revealing the impostors as escaped patients. Pop Pop grabs Becca and imprisons her in his bedroom with Nana, who tries to attack her in a psychotic fit. He then tortures Tyler by smearing his face with his dirty diaper. Following a struggle, Becca fatally stabs Nana with a glass shard from a broken mirror, then runs to the kitchen and attacks Pop Pop. As Pop Pop gains the upper hand, Tyler knocks him to the floor and kills him by repeatedly bashing his head with the refrigerator door. The teens escape outside unharmed, where they are met by their mother and police officers.

In the aftermath, Becca asks Loretta about what happened the day she left home 15 years ago. Loretta states that she had a major argument with her parents, during which she hit her mother and was then struck by her father. Loretta then left home and ignored their attempts to contact her. Loretta concludes that reconciliation was always possible had she wanted it. She then tells Becca not to hold on to anger over her father's abandonment, upon which she includes footage of him in the documentary after earlier saying she would not do so.

Cast
 Olivia DeJonge as Becca
 Ed Oxenbould as Tyler
 Deanna Dunagan as Marja Bella Jamison (Claire), also known as "Nana"
 Peter McRobbie as Frederick Spencer Jamison (Mitchell), also known as "Pop Pop"
 Kathryn Hahn as Loretta Jamison, Becca and Tyler's mother
 Patch Darragh as Dr. Sam
 Celia Keenan-Bolger as Stacey
 Benjamin Kanes as Corin, Becca and Tyler's father

Production
After The Last Airbender and After Earth failed critically, Shyamalan funded The Visit by borrowing $5 million against his home. Filming began on February 19, 2014, under the preliminary title Sundowning. Sundowning is the increased restlessness and confusion of some dementia patients during the afternoon and evening. Shyamalan's Blinding Edge Pictures was the production company, with Shyamalan and Marc Bienstock producing, and Steven Schneider and Ashwin Rajan as executive producers.

Although thousands of American children were auditioned for the film's two lead roles of Becca and Tyler, in what Shyamalan later characterized as a "total fluke", he eventually selected a pair of relatively unknown Australian juvenile actors, Olivia DeJonge and Ed Oxenbould, to portray the film's dual Philadelphia-native teenage protagonists.

Because Shyamalan wanted to avoid reinforcing his reputation for plot twists, The Visit was the director's first film in several years without such a surprise. Every Hollywood studio passed on the rough cut, and Shyamalan feared that he would lose the millions he had invested in the film. Shyamalan admitted that he had trouble keeping the tone for the film consistent during the editing phase, telling Bloody Disgusting that the first cut of the film resembled an art house film more than a horror film. A second cut went in the opposite direction and the film became a comedy. He eventually struck a middle balance and cut the film as a thriller, which, according to him, helped tie the different elements together as they "could stay in service of the movie". After revisions Universal Pictures agreed to distribute the film, and producer Jason Blum and his company Blumhouse Productions were included in the credits.

Music
There is no film score for most of the film, as is common for found footage films. Paul Cantelon is credited for "epilogue theme". A few songs are heard during the film.

Release
Universal began The Visits theatrical wide release in the United States on September 11, 2015. On April 17, 2015, the first official trailer was released to theaters, attached to the film Unfriended, and it was released online later that week. The film premiered in the Republic of Ireland on August 30, 2015, in a special screening that was attended by Shyamalan.

Home media
The Visit was released on Blu-ray and DVD on January 5, 2016.

Reception

Box office
The Visit grossed over $65.2 million in the United States and Canada and over $33.2 million in other territories for a worldwide total of over $98.4 million, against a budget of $5 million. The film grossed $25.4 million in its opening weekend, finishing second at the box office behind The Perfect Guy by just $460,000. Shyamalan kept a list of Hollywood executives who had refused to distribute The Visit, stating in 2018 that most had since been fired.

Critical response
The Visit received generally positive reviews from critics. On review aggregator website Rotten Tomatoes, the film holds an approval rating of 68%, based on 231 reviews, with an average rating of 5.9/10. The site's critical consensus reads, "The Visit provides horror fans with a satisfying blend of thrills and laughs – and also signals a welcome return-to-form for writer-director M. Night Shyamalan." On Metacritic the film has a score of 55 out of 100 based on 34 critics, indicating "mixed or average reviews". Audiences polled by CinemaScore gave the film an average grade of "B−" on an A+ to F scale.

Scott Mendelson from Forbes called Shyamalan's film a "deliciously creepy and funny little triumph". He also wrote, "The Visit is the one we've been waiting for, folks. It's good. Oh my word, is it good. But more importantly, it is excellent in that specific way that reminds us why M. Night Shyamalan was once such a marvel. It is richly humanistic, filled with individually sketched characters that often sparkle with wit and surprising decency." In The New York Times, Manohla Dargis described the film as "an amusingly-grim fairy tale". Shyamalan has gone back to basics, "with a stripped-down story and scale, a largely-unknown (excellent) cast and one of those classically-tinged tales of child peril that have reliably spooked audiences for generations".  She, along with other critics, saw the film as a modern-day version of the classic fairytale Hansel and Gretel.

In his column for The Observer, Mark Kermode panned the film, saying it may be worse than Lady in the Water. He wrote, "Is it meant to be a horror film? Or a comedy? The publicity calls it 'an original thriller' but it is neither of those things. Only 'endurance test' adequately describes the ill-judged shenanigans that ensue." Mike McCahill gave the film one star (out of five) in his review for The Guardian, and said it was "dull, derivative and flatly unscary."

Accolades

References

External links

 
 
 

2015 films
2015 comedy horror films
2015 horror thriller films
2010s psychological horror films
2010s teen horror films
American comedy horror films
American horror thriller films
American psychological horror films
American teen horror films
Blinding Edge Pictures films
Blumhouse Productions films
Films about dysfunctional families
Films about film directors and producers
Films directed by M. Night Shyamalan
Films produced by Jason Blum
Films produced by M. Night Shyamalan
Films scored by Paul Cantelon
Films set on farms
Films set in Pennsylvania
Films shot in Pennsylvania
Films with screenplays by M. Night Shyamalan
Found footage films
Universal Pictures films
2010s English-language films
2010s American films